Seventeen Times Cecile Cassard is a 2002 French drama film directed by Christophe Honoré. It was screened in the Un Certain Regard section at the 2002 Cannes Film Festival.

Cast
 Béatrice Dalle as Cécile Cassard
 Romain Duris as Matthieu
 Jeanne Balibar as Edith
 Ange Ruzé as Erwan
 Johan Oderio-Robles as Lucas
 Tiago Manaïa as Tiago
 Jérôme Kircher as Thierry
 Julien Collet as Stéphane
 Jérémy Sanguinetti as Julien
 Marie Bunel as The teacher
 Assaad Bouab as The waiter
 Fabio Zenoni as The porch man
 Robert Cantarella as The cemetery man

References

External links

2002 films
2002 drama films
French drama films
2000s French-language films
Films directed by Christophe Honoré
2002 directorial debut films
2000s French films